Jaipur is a mandal in Mancherial District in Telangana state in India. The Singareni Thermal Power Plant (2X600MW) was established in Jaipur mandal at Pedapalle village.

Administrative divisions

There are 23 villages in Jaipur mandal.

References 

Mandals in Mancherial district